Araby is a historic house located near Mason Springs, Charles County, Maryland. An example of Federal architecture, it was built in the mid-1700s and underwent extensive renovations a hundred years later. Much of the house remains unaltered from that time.

Merchant William Eilbeck built the plantation house, where he lived with his wife Sarah. He was one of the wealthiest men in Charles County, and held the rank of colonel in the local militia, and by 1745 was one of the gentleman justices of the local court. Eilbeck also had another plantation nearby, but only one child, a daughter Anne. In 1750, planter George Mason married Anne. The young couple lived with the Eilbecks while constructing Gunston Hall on his Virginia estates, and continued to visit Araby from time to time. Another of Anne's former suitors, George Washington, who owned a nearby property, was a frequent visitor. Sarah Eilbeck survived her husband, so Araby did not pass to their third grandson William Mason (1757-1820) until her death in 1780, when he was 23 and an officer in the Fairfax militia.

It was listed on the National Register of Historic Places in 1974.

References

External links

, including undated photo, at Maryland Historical Trust

Houses completed in the 18th century
Houses in Charles County, Maryland
Houses on the National Register of Historic Places in Maryland
Federal architecture in Maryland
Georgian architecture in Maryland
Mason family residences
National Register of Historic Places in Charles County, Maryland
1700s establishments in Maryland